Rosie Rudin (born 14 August 1998) is a British swimmer. She competed in the women's 200 metre backstroke event at the 2017 World Aquatics Championships.

References

1998 births
Living people
British female swimmers
Place of birth missing (living people)
British female backstroke swimmers
21st-century British women